Thilina Herath (born 16 May 1987) is a Sri Lankan cricketer. He made his List A debut for Kurunegala District in the 2016–17 Districts One Day Tournament on 18 March 2017.

References

External links
 

1987 births
Living people
Sri Lankan cricketers
Kurunegala District cricketers
Kurunegala Youth Cricket Club cricketers
Sportspeople from Kurunegala